Hoplitaspis is a genus of chasmataspidid, an extinct group of aquatic arthropods. Fossils of Hoplitaspis have been discovered in Late Ordovician deposits of the Lagerstätte of the Big Hill Formation exposed at Stonington Peninsular in Michigan's Upper Peninsula, United States. Its generic name is derived from the hoplites (Ancient Greek citizen-soldiers) and the Ancient Greek word άσπίς (aspis, meaning "shield"). The specific name hiawathai honors Hiawatha, a Native American leader and co-founder of the Iroquois Confederacy.

References 

Diploaspididae
Late Ordovician first appearances
Ordovician chasmataspidids
Chasmataspidids of North America
Fossils of the United States
Fossil taxa described in 2019